The Ardjachie Stone is an uncut but decorated red sandstone boulder discovered by farmers in 1960 on the Ardjachie Farm in the Tarbat peninsula of Easter Ross. It now stands outside of the museum of Tain. On it are depicted several dozen cup or ring marks probably dating to the Bronze Age. It also has an inverted-L design with a wheel image above, both of probable Pictish origin. It therefore may be considered a Class I Pictish stone.

References
 Fraser, Iain, Ritchie, J.N.G., et al., Pictish Symbol Stones: An Illustrated Gazetteer, (Royal Commission on the Ancient and Historical Monuments of Scotland, 1999)
 MacNamara, Ellen, The Pictish Stones of Easter Ross, (Tain, 2003)
 Scott, Douglas, The Stones of the Pictish Peninsulas, (Hilton Trust, 2004)

External links
 Image on the Pictish Stones Search Facility at the University of Strathclyde

 

Pictish stones
Pictish stones in Highland (council area)